Aeris Williams (born August 9, 1995) is a former American football running back for Mississippi State.

Early years 
Williams was a 4-star recruit out of West Point High School after being named the Mississippi Association of Coaches 5A Offensive Player of the Year and WCBI-TV Offensive Player of the Year following a 1,697 rushing yards, 21 touchdown campaign his senior year.  He was named to the Alabama-Mississippi All-Star Classic and was a 2014 U.S. Army All-American Bowl nominee.

College career 
During his junior season, Williams was the Bulldogs' first running back 1,000-yard rusher since 2014, when he put up 1,107 on 236 attempts.  He finished his MSU career with 2,557 yards and a 5.1 yards/carry average.

Williams was invited to and participated in the 2019 College Gridiron Showcase college football all-star event.

References

External links 
 Mississippi State Bulldogs bio

1995 births
Living people
American football running backs
Mississippi State Bulldogs football players
Mississippi State University alumni